This is a list of large or well-known interstate or international companies headquartered in Bellevue, Washington.

Currently based in Bellevue
 5th Cell - video game developer; created Scribblenauts and Drawn to Life
 Apptio - developer of software used to evaluate and manage portfolios of IT investments through an integrated view of IT cost, performance, supply, and demand
 ArenaNet - PC game developer of Guild Wars series; many ArenaNet employees formerly worked for Blizzard Entertainment
 Baratza - coffee grinder company
 Bungie - video game studio known for the popular Halo and Destiny franchises
 Coinstar - producer of coin exchange kiosks and other coin services
 Concur Technologies - offers online integrated travel and expense management for businesses; relocated its headquarters in 2013 from Redmond to the Key Center building
 Dreambox - online elementary and middle school math software; headquartered in downtown Bellevue
 Drugstore.com - online pharmacy and information site for health, beauty, wellness, personal care, and pharmacy products
 Eddie Bauer - relocated its headquarters from Redmond to a 28-story office tower at Lincoln Square, which was completed in mid-2007; shares the tower with Microsoft's North American sales headquarters
 Esterline - publicly traded company that designs, manufactures, and markets specialty products primarily for aerospace and defense customers
 Expedia Group - online travel company, which occupies Tower 333 (renamed the Expedia building) beginning November 2008
 GlobalScholar - an operating unit of Scantron
 Icertis - software company for contract management
 InfoSpace - a growing Internet private-label search engine and online directory that survived the dot.com bust of the 1990s; reemerging in the mid-2000s with a mobile entertainment offering
 Intellectual Ventures - a growing intellectual property investment company, prominently featured in the book Superfreakonomics
 MulvannyG2 Architecture - moved to Seattle in 2015; now called MG2; the headquarters for the international architectural firm working with both commercial and mixed use projects
 OfferUp - mobile marketplace
 Orahealth Corporation -  pharmaceutical manufacturer specializing in oral health care products
 Outerwall - owner and operator of coin-exchanging and movie rental kiosks found in supermarkets
 Paccar - world's third-largest producer of heavy duty Class 8 trucks (semis) sold under the Kenworth, Peterbilt, DAF and Leyland nameplates
 The Pokémon Company International -  North American headquarters for US operations for marketing and licensing the Pokémon franchise
 QFC - Quality Food Centers; headquartered in Bellevue; a Washington and Oregon chain of upscale grocery stores (a wholly owned subsidiary of Kroger)
 Savers - operators of the Value Village thrift store chain
 Smartsheet- Software as a service (SaaS) application for collaboration and work management
 Sucker Punch Productions - Sony game developer which produced Sly Cooper, InFamous, and Rocket: Robot on Wheels
 Symetra - life insurance company
tinyBuild - indie game publisher
 T-Mobile US - headquarters for their US operations are located in Factoria, a neighborhood of Bellevue; operates a nationwide 4G LTE network; Bellevue's second-largest employer, with over 4,800 employees on the campus  and America's third largest mobile carrier. 
 Valve - computer software/video games developer responsible for PC game client Steam, and best-selling games such as the Half-Life series,  Portal series, and Team Fortress 2
 WizKids - non-electronic game developer producing everything from collectible miniatures games to board games

Branches based in Bellevue
 Boeing - aircraft manufacturer's Bellevue's third-largest employer with over 2,800 employees
HTC Corporation - Taiwan-based manufacturer of smartphones and portable computing devices
 Microsoft - Bellevue's largest employer, with 7,500 employees
 Merrill Lynch - wealth management
 Nokia - Finnish based telecommunication equipment and services provider
 Samsung - multinational conglomerate, primarily electronics
 Salesforce - cloud based CRM solutions provider
 Tata Consultancy Services - is an Indian multinational information technology service and consulting company headquartered in Mumbai, Maharashtra, India. It is a subsidiary of Tata Group; TCS is the largest Indian company by market capitalization. 
 Unity Technologies - 2D, 3D and VR Game Engine

References

Bellevue